Sam Lucchese (1868–1929) was an Italian-born American businessman and impresario. He was the founder of the Lucchese Boot Company and the owner of Spanish-language theaters in San Antonio and Laredo, Texas.

Early life
Sam Lucchese was born on February 24, 1868, in Palermo, Sicily, Italy. He immigrated to the United States in 1883 with his parents and siblings, settling in San Antonio, Texas.

Career
Lucchese was a businessman. In 1883, he co-founded the Lucchese Boot Company with his brother in San Antonio.

With the revenue from his boot company, Lucchese opened Spanish-speaking theaters in San Antonio and Laredo. In 1912, he acquired the Teatro Zaragoza on the corner of Commerce Street and Santa Rosa Street in San Antonio. Five years later, in 1917, he acquired the Teatro Nacional, located at the same intersection in San Antonio. An impresario, he hired actors from Mexico to perform in his theaters.

Personal life
He married Frances Battaglia. They had three sons and two daughters, including, Josephine Lucchese, who became a renowned opera vocalist.

Death and legacy
He died of a stroke on January 15, 1929, in San Antonio, Texas. He was buried at Saint Mary's Cemetery. After his death, his son Cosimo took over the Lucchese Boot Company. His grandson, Samuel James Lucchese, succeeded him, and designed boots for many actors.

References

External links

1868 births
1929 deaths
Businesspeople from Palermo
Italian emigrants to the United States
People from San Antonio
Businesspeople from Texas
American company founders
American fashion businesspeople
Theatre owners
Impresarios